The ninth series of the BBC espionage television series Spooks began broadcasting on 20 September 2010 before ending on 8 November 2010. The series consists of eight episodes.

Cast
Main
 Richard Armitage as Lucas North
 Sophia Myles as Beth Bailey
 Max Brown as Dimitri Levendis
 Shazad Latif as Tariq Masood
with Nicola Walker as Ruth Evershed
and Peter Firth as Harry Pearce

Guests
 Iain Glen as Vaughn Edwards
 Simon Russell Beale as William Towers (7 episodes)
 Laila Rouass as Maya Lahan (7 episodes)
 Colin Salmon as Alton Beecher (2 episodes)
 Hugh Simon as Malcolm Wynn-Jones (2 episodes) (episode 6 & 7)
Hi Ching as Yimou (2 episodes)
 Robert Glenister as Nicholas Blake (1 episode)

Episodes

Production
The series introduces Jonathan Brackley and Sam Vincent as the new head writers, having written five of the eight episodes together. Both writers got into the series after sending a script of an original thriller to Kudos Film and Television. The production company responded by offering them a position to write for Spooks. Because both were fans of the series since the beginning, they accepted and felt it was "a bit of a dream job." Both writers were mostly influenced by the works of Joss Whedon to write their scripts. Because they wrote their scripts together, they tried various ways to write them, but found the most productive method was for one to write five pages, then have the other edit it and write the next five pages, as it would keep both voices consistent.

Home video release
The ninth series was released on DVD in the United Kingdom on 28 February 2011. The box set consists of all eight episodes from the series. Extras include two featurettes entitled The Cost of Being a Spy and The Downfall of Lucas North, as well as episode audio commentaries by Jonathan Brackley, Anthony Neilson, Sam Vincent, Nicola Walker, and Andrew Woodhead.

References

External links
 

2010 British television seasons
Spooks (TV series)